"Still Waiting" is a song by Canadian rock band Sum 41. It was released in November 2002 as the lead single from the album Does This Look Infected?.

Song meaning

The song is an anti-George W. Bush and anti-Iraq War song.

Music video

The video, directed by Marc Klasfeld, starts with the band members entering the office of a record executive (played by Will Sasso). He says the "number band thing" is "out" and changes the band's name to "The Sums" and the members' individual names (Deryck is "Sven", Cone is "Thurston", Dave is "Holmes", and Stevo is "Sergio"). The band then plays the song on a set spoofing The Hives, The Strokes, and The Vines and includes various images of arcade games. At the start of the last chorus, Deryck breaks the choreography and starts trashing his equipment and Dave, Cone, and Stevo do the same thing. The video ends with the four band members pushing down The Sums' name behind them.

Apart from the introduction, the performance was recorded at 30 frames per second (on video) as if it was a live performance.

The video contains an easter egg at 1:37, spotting a hangman game screen for a few frames, with "SU_ _1" / "SU_ 41" as text and "LAO GHQ KE9" letters of unknown meaning.

Critical reception

Gareth Dobson of Drowned in Sound criticized the song, writing "Worst of all, the band choose to articulate their sense of misplaced rage in the form of a sub-Offspring SoCal punk dirge. I'd like to say I preferred it when they sang about girls n'that, but I didn't. I just want them to go away."

Track listing
CD single
 Still Waiting
 All Messed Up (Demo)
 Motivation (Live at the Astoria)
 Still Waiting (Demo) (Absent on some versions)
 Still Waiting (CD ROM Video)

CD Single 2
 Still Waiting
 In Too Deep (live from Astoria)
 Fat Lip (live from Astoria)

CD Single 3
 Still Waiting
 All Messed Up (Demo)

Charts

Certifications

References

External links

Music sheet

2002 singles
2002 songs
Sum 41 songs
Music videos directed by Marc Klasfeld
Anti-war songs
Melodic hardcore songs
Island Records singles
Heavy metal songs